This List of places in the Channel Islands is a complete collection of lists of islands in the group named "The Channel Islands". The islands are divided into two British Crown dependencies: the Bailiwick of Jersey, and the Bailiwick of Guernsey. Chausey is part of Manche, a department of mainland Normandy within France.

Bailiwick of Guernsey 

The bailiwick of Guernsey contains the following:

Guernsey
Alderney
Sark
Herm
Jethou
Brecqhou (Brechou)
Lihou
Burhou
Casquets

Bailiwick of Jersey 

Jersey
Minquiers
Écréhous
Les Dirouilles
Les Pierres de Lecq (the Paternosters)

Chausey

 Grande-Île

See also
Parishes of Jersey
Parishes of Guernsey

References 

Geography of the Channel Islands